The 2007–08 Queensland Roar season was the club's third season participating in the A-League where they would finish in fourth place in the regular season.

2007–08 season
Failure to qualify for the 2006–2007 finals series resulted in the release from contract of defenders Chad Gibson (the club's first captain and A-league pin-up boy) and Swiss import Remo Buess. Both left on good terms with the club during January 2007 stating that the team had to be altered to make it more competitive in the future.

In further evidence of "spring cleaning" in preparation for Season 3, Chinese signing Yuning Zhang was released from an inauspicious contract with the Roar. Billed as the Chinese David Beckham, Zhang underwhelmed Roar supporters and will return to China in search of a club within the local scene there.

Danny Tiatto has signed a two-year contract with Queensland Roar, becoming Frank Farina's first 07/08 signing . Tiatto, who has played in England for the past 11 years for Leicester City and Manchester City, agreed to terms with Queensland after Melbourne declined to sign him.

Farina has highlighted his favoritism toward young Queensland and indeed Australian players with the signings for the 2007–08 season of highly rated Queenslanders and Youth International Strikers Robbie Kruse and Tahj Minniecon, as well as attacking Midfielder Mitch Nichols. Also, the contracts of highly rated 20-year-olds Chris Grossman and Ben Griffin have been renewed, while Farina has given two-year contracts to Queenslanders Under-17 International Striker Tahj Minniecon and Under-20 and AIS Scholarship holder Robbie. These signings have all made the Roar a team of bright, young talent, predominantly Queenslanders which is Farina's focus.

Queensland Roar's German import Marcus Wedau has been released from the remaining year of his contract by the A-League club on compassionate grounds. Wedau, 31, will return to Germany to be with his pregnant partner who is expecting their first child in October.

On 25 July 2007, Craig Moore was unveiled as the new marquee player for the Roar, returning to his native home state of Queensland, Australia, to play in the 2007/2008 Hyundai A-League Season and the 2008–2009 season

Squad

Trialists

Transfers

In

Out

Pre-season

Pre-season Cup group stage

Pre-season Cup semi-final

Pre-season Cup third place playoff

Hyundai A-League fixtures

Home and Away

Finals

Ladder position

References

Brisbane Roar FC seasons
Queensland Roar Season, 2007-08